The Myst series of adventure computer games deals with the events following the player's discovery of a mysterious book describing an island known as Myst. The book is no ordinary volume; it is a linking book, which serves as a portal to the world it describes. The player is transported to Myst Island and must unravel the world's puzzles in order to return home. Myst was a commercial and critical success upon release and spawned four sequels—Riven, Exile, Revelation and End of Ages— as well as several spinoffs and adaptations.

While the player, referred to as a Stranger, remains faceless and unnamed, Myst and its sequels introduce a variety of non-player characters. The inhabitants of Myst include the explorer Atrus, a writer of many linking books, and his wife Catherine and their children. Other characters introduced in the series include Gehn, Atrus' power-hungry father; Saavedro, a traumatized victim of Atrus' sons; and Esher, a member of an old civilization whose motives for helping the player are ambiguous.

The first Myst titles used pre-rendered graphics, and digitally inserted footage of live actors into the backgrounds. For Myst V: End of Ages, a different approach was taken: a special camera recorded actors' faces and mapped the video onto digital models. The characters of Myst have been generally praised in each installment. Reviewers found that the live action characters increased immersion, while the digital body language and spoken conviction in End of Ages endeared the characters to the player. Dissenting reviewers considered Mysts acting melodramatic and overwrought.

Development
When the first game in the franchise, Myst, was created, all the characters were created from footage of live actors. The actors were filmed on a bluescreen, then added to the pre-rendered backgrounds via chroma key. Due to a limited amount of time and money, Mysts creators, Rand and Robyn Miller, took on roles in the game themselves.

The Ages of Myst were occasionally seen as lonely by players and reviewers. As a result, Cyan added more characters to the sequel, Riven. Villagers scurry away as the player approaches, and major characters such as Gehn and a rebel band known as the Moiety address the player and give or take items away from him or her. For the first time, Cyan directed the live action actors for Rivens scenes; the designers, including Richard Vander Wende, were apprehensive about how the characters would fit in the finished product. Rand Miller reprised the role of Atrus due to fan expectation, even though he hated acting.

Later Myst titles improved on the integration of live action sequences in the prerendered environments of the games. Myst III: Exiles developers filmed all the scenes using standard definition cameras, which producer Dan Irish looked back on as a mistake; by not using high definition video cameras, the video did not look crisp at high resolutions. For the next game, Myst IV: Revelation, Ubisoft allowed players to move the game camera and interact with the video while it was playing through the use of the ALIVE game engine.

Myst V: End of Ages was developed so that players could freely navigate Ages rendered in real time, which meant that the digital insertion of characters into the settings was not feasible. The models for End of Agess characters were instead computer-generated. A special device was created that captured video of the actors' faces while they spoke their lines, as Cyan did not want to lose the warmth and feeling provided by using a live actor. The video was then manipulated and used as a facial texture that was mapped onto the 3D characters. Motion capture was also used to ensure lifelike movement. Cyan staff worried that the audio syncing for animation would not be finished in time for the E3 unveiling of the game, but were happy with the end results.

The player character in Myst, Riven, Exile and Revelation is never given a name and remains faceless at all times. Atrus addresses the player character as "my friend" in cutscenes. Cyan's intent was for players to feel as though they were themselves there, stranded on a mysterious island with no choice but to explore. Thus, the games' protagonist is an anonymous, gender-neutral entity with no given history, and players are free to imagine themselves as the protagonist.

Characters

Atrus and Catherine

Atrus is the main non-player character in the Myst series, appearing in all five games of the main series; he also narrates the opening of Uru: Ages Beyond Myst. He is a member of the ancient D'ni civilization, though his only D'ni inheritance is through his paternal grandfather. The D'ni perfected a craft known as the Art, which allowed them to create portals to other worlds known as Ages by writing a descriptive "linking book". After the fall of the D'ni civilization, Atrus' father, Gehn, teaches him the Art and Atrus creates many linking books, surpassing his father's skill in writing. Atrus comes to understand his father's power-hungry nature; as punishment for defying him, Gehn traps Atrus on K'veer, an island off of the main D'ni city, with a book leading to Gehn's Age of Riven as the only escape.

On Riven, Atrus meets Catherine, a local inhabitant and a brilliant student of Gehn's who shows promise in the Art of writing Ages, despite not being D'ni herself. Together they trap Gehn on Riven. Atrus' grandmother, Anna ("Ti'ana"), helps Catherine by writing the Age of Myst as an escape route while Atrus destroys every other linking book on Riven.  The linking book to Myst is dropped into a starry expanse known as the Star Fissure, where it is presumed lost (but later found by the Stranger, beginning the events of Myst). Catherine and Atrus start a family on Myst, raising their two sons, Sirrus and Achenar; however, both boys grow greedy and seek to strand their parents, trapping Atrus on K'veer and luring Catherine to Riven, where she is captured by Gehn. The Stranger's discovery of the Myst linking book saves Atrus from being trapped in K'veer a second time, and Catherine from Gehn's clutches. Moving to Tomahna, Atrus and Catherine have a third child, their daughter Yeesha, and attempt to resurrect the D'ni by writing a new Age for the people called Releeshahn. By the events of End of Ages, Catherine has died (likely from old age), and an elderly Atrus confines himself in Releeshahn to live out the rest of his life. Atrus is played by Rand Miller in all the Myst installments. Catherine is portrayed by Sheila Goold in Riven, with her voice dubbed by Rengin Altay, and Maria Galante in Exile.

Sirrus and Achenar

Sirrus and Achenar are the sons of Atrus and Catherine and are the eldest of their three children. They first appear in Myst, trapped in two different books. Each swears that he is innocent of plundering their father's Ages, claims that Atrus is dead, and that the other brother is to blame. In actuality, both brothers grew greedy, destroyed Atrus' library, killed the inhabitants of the Ages, and attempted to strand their parents forever. They in turn are trapped in special prison books Atrus designed to imprison unwanted travelers. Once he is freed by the Stranger, Atrus burns Sirrus and Achenar's books.

Revelation reveals that the brothers remained exiled on two different Ages for twenty years, where Atrus and Catherine hoped they would reform. During his imprisonment in the inhospitable Age of Spire, Sirrus learns to harness the Age's electromagnetism to create crude airships and crystalline explosives. He is thoroughly embittered by his exile, especially when he learns about his sister Yeesha and how Atrus is teaching her the D'ni language and the Art of Writing, which he never taught his sons. Sirrus uses his explosives to breach the linking chamber Atrus installed, and manages to escape. Achenar, trapped in the jungle Age of Haven, becomes a game hunter preying upon the local wildlife. However, he is overcome with remorse when he hunts one species to extinction, and is later befriended by a group of monkey-like creatures. After Sirrus helps Achenar escape, they travel to the Age of Serenia. According to a journal Achenar kept on Serenia twenty years before, Sirrus' original plan was to trap Catherine on Riven and use an aging "Memory Chamber" to steal Atrus' knowledge of the Art. After escaping from Spire, Sirrus kidnaps Yeesha and uses the old Memory Chamber to take over her body, intending to play-act as Yeesha long enough to learn the Art before killing his parents. Achenar, who has reformed during his imprisonment, helps the Stranger set Yeesha's memories right again. Sirrus is killed when the Stranger reverses the mind-switch; Achenar is fatally poisoned when he repairs the machinery to save his sister. In Myst, Sirrus was played by Robyn Miller, and Achenar by his brother Rand; in Revelation, the brothers are played by Brian Wrench and Guy Sprung, respectively.

Yeesha
Yeesha is the only daughter of Atrus and Catherine. She is briefly mentioned in the novel Myst: The Book of D'ni, and is first seen as an infant in Exile. Yeesha is seen by her parents as a correction to the mistakes they made with their wayward sons. Her parents teach her D'ni and the Art. In Revelation, her brother Sirrus attempts to use Yeesha in a plan to learn the Art and kill his parents, but Yeesha is freed by the Stranger and Achenar.

An adult Yeesha appears in Uru: Ages Beyond Myst and is one of two main characters in End of Ages, where she tries to persuade the player to help free an enslaved race known as the Bahro by unlocking a powerful Tablet.  Over the course of her life, Yeesha takes on many roles, eventually assuming the aspect of a prophesied D'ni savior-figure known as "The Grower".  Baby Yeesha is played by Exile game producer Greg Uhler's daughter. Juliette Gosselin plays a young Yeesha in Revelation and Rengin Altay voices the character as an adult in Uru and End of Ages.

Gehn

Gehn is the father of Atrus, and the antagonist of Riven. Gehn is born to Master Aitrus of the Guild of Surveyors (for whom his son is named) and his human wife, Anna (or Ti'ana, as she is known in D'ni), shortly before the downfall of the D'ni civilization. Believing that he creates worlds by writing linking books, Gehn considers himself a god and dedicates his life to rebuilding the fallen D'ni empire. Realizing his madness, Atrus turns against his father; with the help of Catherine, he traps Gehn on the Age of Riven, "a prison of my own creation" as Gehn later relates it, for nearly thirty years.

Gehn's inability to grasp the fine aspects of the Art of Writing, leading him to copy or alter sentences from existing books rather than writing original passages, results in his Ages being unstable.  Gehn tends to be unimaginative: besides having no talent for the Art, he merely numbers his Ages rather than naming them (Riven is his "Fifth Age", for instance), and as long as it will give him what he seeks, prefers to smash his way through D'ni puzzle locks made with delicate materials rather than figure them out.

When Catherine is stranded on Riven, Atrus must send the Stranger to rescue her, as he is busy making changes to the Age to delay its collapse. The Stranger tricks Gehn into a special prison book created by Atrus, and Gehn's oppressed subjects are evacuated from Riven before the Age of Riven closes forever. Gehn is portrayed by John Keston.

Saavedro
Saavedro is the antagonist of Exile. Depicted as a vengeful and broken man, Saavedro is an inhabitant of the Age of Narayan, one of the Ages chosen by Atrus to try to teach his sons Sirrus and Achenar about the Art of writing books linking to other worlds. Saavedro agrees to help tutor Atrus' sons, but is shocked when the brothers instigate a destructive rebellion and abandon the Age to be destroyed from within. When Saavedro pursues Sirrus and Achenar to the Age of J'nanin, he is assaulted and left for dead. Trapped on J'nanin and believing Narayan destroyed and his family to be dead, Saavedro's mental health deteriorates during his years of captivity. When Saavedro is unexpectedly freed and travels to Tomahna in hope of finding the brothers, he steals the linking book for Releeshahn in a plan to lure Atrus to Narayan and exact revenge. Once on Narayan, Saavedro discovers that his people have not been destroyed. Cornered by the Stranger, Saavedro gives up the Releeshahn book. In the game's optimal ending, the player enables Saavedro to peacefully return to Narayan, before taking Releeshahn back to Atrus. Saavedro is portrayed by veteran actor Brad Dourif, who accepted the role of Saavedro because he was a Myst fan. Dourif said that his role for the game was much more difficult than working on movie sets, as he could not see the player he was addressing or interact with the game environment.

Esher
Esher is a D'ni who survived the downfall of his civilization, and the antagonist of End of Ages. Throughout the game he appears to the player, offering advice and background on different Ages. Esher warns the player not to trust Yeesha, suggesting she has tasked the player with unlocking a powerful Tablet in order to steal its power for herself.  If the player gives Esher the tablet instead in one of the bad endings of the game, Esher proclaims that he wishes to use the Tablet to control a powerful race of creatures called Bahro for his own purposes, and strands the player on the Age of Myst. The best ending the player can choose results in Esher being handed over to the liberated Bahro to pay for his crimes. Esher is voiced, and portrayed (in the form of video-recorded facial texture-mapping), by David Ogden Stiers, who received acclaim for his performance.

Reception
The absence of character interaction in Myst and Riven was commented upon in reviews. Adventure Gamers called the lack of characters a bad element of the games. Conversely, Laura Miller of Salon called the isolation a distinctive and welcome touch. In comparison to contemporary games, the deep solitude allowed the player to focus on puzzles. "Games with implausible and annoying characters popping up at regular intervals are just too stressful," said Miller.

From Exile onward, the characters of Myst were generally praised in each release. The live-action characters in the pre-rendered Myst titles were favorably received; Greg Kasavin of GameSpot said that the series' use of real actors and full-motion video endeared the characters to the player, giving the games a distinctively personal touch. Fellow GameSpot reviewer Scott Osborne stated the actors delivered convincing performances, and were smoothly incorporated into the game's scenes. The reviewers of G4tv, on the other hand, called the acting of the earlier installments overwrought and melodramatic.

The change from full motion video to computer generated characters in End of Ages was well received. Macworld stated that the change was initially jarring, but ultimately helped increase the realism of the game. IGN's Juan Castro said that the characters felt more real than the full motion video actors of previous games; one reason, the reviewer stated, was because the actors spoke their lines with real conviction. Gamezone credited each character's individualized body language as contributing to their realism. GameSpot stated that Esher moved and acted like a real person, and that the voice of David Ogden Stiers brought "this interesting character to life"; the reviewer did feel that the revelation of Esher and Yeesha's motivations was a letdown, as the character's true motivations were revealed "with all the unpleasant abruptness of turning on bright, fluorescent lights in a dark room." Dissenting reviewers such as 1UP.com and G4tv considered the character's monologues "hyper emotional", although reviewer Karen Chu admitted the characters still presented a compelling morality play.

References

External links
Cyan's D'ni timeline page

Myst (series)
Fictional families
Myst